Stade Guy Boniface is a multi-use stadium in Mont-de-Marsan, France.

It is currently used mostly for rugby union matches and is the home stadium of Stade Montois, currently playing in the country's top league, the Top 14. The stadium can hold 16,800 people and opened in 1965.

The stadium is named after Guy Boniface, a French rugby union footballer.

References

Guy Boniface
Mont-de-Marsan
Sports venues in Landes (department)
Sports venues completed in 1965